Namysłaki  is a village in the administrative district of Gmina Sieroszewice, within Ostrów Wielkopolski County, Greater Poland Voivodeship, in west-central Poland.

The former name in the 18th century was Deutschhof, a part of the German Rich (Deutsches Reich) in the former Provinz Posen in the circle Schildberg. It came to Poland after the First World War.

References 

Villages in Ostrów Wielkopolski County